The following are the Oceanian records in Olympic weightlifting. Records are maintained in each weight class for the snatch lift, clean and jerk lift, and the total for both lifts by the Oceania Weightlifting Federation (OWF).

Current records
Key to tables:

Men

Women

Historical records

Men (1998–2018)

Women (1998–2018)

Notes

References
General
Oceanian Weightlifting Records December 2022 updated
Specific

External links
OWF web site

 
Weightlifting in Oceania
Oceanian
Weightlifting